Get a Life is a 1998 album by Doug Sahm released by the Dutch label Munich Records. The tracks were recorded in Austin and San Marcos, Texas, Seattle, Washington and Los Angeles, California. The producers of the tracks included Sahm, Mike Stewart, Billy Stull and Bob Flick. Sahm wrote the liner notes for the album. The recordings featured The Gourds, as well as Augie Meyers. Sahm met The Gourds as he performed at a music festival in Belgium in 1997. Sahm approached the band after he heard them sing a cover of his original "At the Crossroads".

The release was credited to Doug Sahm - A.K.A. The Texas Tornado. Watermelon Records released the album as S.D.Q. 98' in the United States in October 1998. The Austin American-Statesman gave the album three stars out of five, and called it a "happily jumbled affair". Meanwhile, AllMusic rated it with four-and-a-half stars out of five. Critic Eugene Chadbourne felt that "musically there is enough (on the album) to create a tidal wave."

Track listing

Personnel

Doug Sahm - vocals, guitar, fiddle, bajo sexto, steel guitar, hammond organ, piano
Augie Meyers - vocals, accordion, Vox organ, piano
Shawn Sahm - guitar
The Gourds (Kevin Russel, Jimmy Smith, Claude Bernard) - vocals
Clay Meyers - drums, maracas
Ernie Durawa - drums
George Rains - drums
Keith Langford - drums
Rocky morales - tenor saxophone
Mike O'Dowd - tenor saxophone
Tommy Detamore - pedal steel guitar, guitar
Kevin Russell - guitar, mandolin
Speedy Sparks - bass
Jimmy Smith - bass
Studio:
Doug Sahm - producer, arrangements
Bob Flick - producer, arrangements
Mike Stewart - producer, sound engineer
Billy Stull - producer, sound engineer
Bobby Arnold - sound engineer
Gary Higganbotham - sound engineer
Boo McLoed - sound engineer
P.T. Huston - sound engineer
Debora Hanson - production coordinator

References

1998 albums
Doug Sahm albums